Emperador Carlos V was an armored cruiser of the Spanish Navy which served in the Spanish fleet from 1898 to 1933. The money intended to build torpedo boats was used to build a 9,000-ton cruiser, deriving this cruiser from the British . Said cruiser stood out for its great autonomy, while it suffered from having little armor, mounting only during its first days of life 4 pieces of García Lomas of 100 mm.

Technical characteristics

Emperador Carlos V was built at the naval shipyard at Cadiz, Spain, the largest ship built in Spanish yards in this era. She was laid down in 1892, launched on 13 March 1895, and completed on 2 June 1898.  She was the only member of her class.  Her boilers and machinery were of Spanish construction, her armor German, her stern and stern post British, and her gun turrets, which were installed at Le Havre, France, in 1897, were French. She had three funnels and was weakly armored, relying mostly on her armored deck for protection.  Her  main guns were mounted fore and aft in centerline hooded barbettes.  One of her strengths was considered to be her great steaming range.

As a curiosity, the day before it was launched, the cruise Reina Regente sank because its captain forced it to cross the Strait of Gibraltar in the middle of a storm in order to attend the launching ceremony in person. The entire crew of the ship died, 420 sailors and officers.

Operational history

Emperador Carlos V was brand new and not yet operational when the Spanish–American War broke out in April 1898, but she was rushed into service and assigned to the 2nd Squadron, commanded by Rear Admiral Manuel de Camara. This squadron was ordered to steam to the Philippines and face the U.S. Navy's Asiatic Squadron, which had controlled Philippine waters since defeating the Spanish squadron of Rear Admiral Patricio Montojo y Pasaron in the Battle of Manila Bay.

It arrived at Port Said, Egypt, on 26 June 1898, and requested permission to transship coal, which the Egyptian government finally denied on 30 June 1898 out of concern for Egyptian neutrality. By the time Camara's squadron arrived at Suez on 5 July 1898, the squadron of Vice Admiral Pascual Cervera y Topete had been annihilated in the Battle of Santiago de Cuba, freeing up the U.S. Navy's heavy forces from the blockade of Santiago de Cuba. Fearful of the security of the Spanish coast, the Spanish Ministry of Marine recalled Camara's squadron on 7 July 1898, and Emperador Carlos V returned to Spain, where Camara's 2nd Squadron was dissolved on 25 July 1898. Emperador Carlos V spent the last month of the war in Spanish waters, and thus missed combat.

After the war, Emperador Carlos V conducted cruises to show the flag, attending naval reviews in foreign countries, most notably including the coronation of King Edward VII of the United Kingdom in 1902.

In 1914 she was present at the United States occupation of Veracruz.

She was decommissioned in 1922, stricken in 1932, and scrapped in 1933.

Notes

References
Cervera Y Topete, Pascual. Office of Naval Intelligence War Notes No. VII: Information From Abroad: The Spanish–American War: A Collection of Documents Relative to the Squadron Operations in the West Indies, Translated From the Spanish. Washington, D.C.: Government Printing Office, 1899.
Chesneau, Roger, and Eugene M. Kolesnik, Eds. Conway's All The World's Fighting Ships 1860–1905. New York, New York: Mayflower Books Inc., 1979. .
Gray, Randal, Ed. Conway's All The World's Fighting Ships 1906–1921. Annapolis, Maryland: Naval Institute Press, 1985. .
Nofi, Albert A.  The Spanish–American War, 1898. Conshohocken, Pennsylvania:Combined Books, Inc., 1996. .

External links

The Spanish–American War Centennial Website: Carlos V
Department of the Navy: Naval Historical Center: Online Library of Selected Images: Spanish Navy Ships: Carlos V (Cruiser, 1895–1933), originally named Emperador Carlos V 

Cruisers of the Spanish Navy
Ships built in Spain
1895 ships
Spanish–American War cruisers of Spain